Duelist may refer to:

 A person who participates in duels
 The Duellists, a 1977 film directed by Ridley Scott
 Duelist (2005 film), a 2005 South Korean martial arts film directed by Lee Myung-se
 The Duelist (2016 film), a 2016 action adventure thriller drama film directed by Alexey Mizgirev
 The Duelist (magazine), an American collectible and trading card magazine
 Duelyst, a video game
 "Duelist", Dungeon & Fighter OF Demonic Lancer Class
 "Duelist", Yu-Gi-Oh OF card name

See also
Dualism (disambiguation)